Robert Bruce Whan  (5 January 1933 – 4 October 2015) was an Australian  politician. He was a member of the Australian Labor Party (ALP) and represented the Division of Eden-Monaro in the House of Representatives from 1972 to 1975. He worked in the wool industry before entering politics.

Early life
Whan was born in Wodonga, Victoria. His parents moved to Melbourne where he attended East Kew Central School and Richmond Technical College. He left school at the age of 15 and went with his family to King Island, where he worked in the dairy industry. Whan later moved to Albury, New South Wales, where he worked in a woolstore and gained a wool classing certificate. He later attained a degree in wool technology from the University of New South Wales and completed postgraduate studies at the University of Leeds in England. He worked as a public servant before entering politics, serving as the officer-in-charge of the wool marketing section of the Bureau of Agricultural Economics.

Politics
Whan was elected to federal parliament at the 1972 federal election, as the Labor candidate in the Division of Eden-Monaro. He won the seat by a margin of 503 votes, and retained it at the 1974 election by a margin of 146 votes, making it one of the most marginal seats in the country. He lost his seat in Labor's landslide defeat at the 1975 election, although the relatively small swing against him was seen as evidence of his personal following.

Whan won Labor preselection as the Labor candidate in the Division of Canberra at the 1977 election, but following a series of challenges the initial ballot was overturned and he was replaced by Henry Lawrence, who lost to the incumbent Liberal MP John Haslem. He later served as chief of staff to Richard Amery.

Later life
After his defeat Whan served as head of the New South Wales Milk Board and executive director of the Australian Council for Overseas Aid. He was also a founder of Jobless Action, a Canberra-based organisation.

Personal life
Whan died of cardiac arrest on 4 October 2015 at the age of 82. His son, Steve Whan was the member for Monaro in the New South Wales Legislative Assembly from 2003 to 2011 and a member of the Legislative Council from 2011 to 2015.

Prior to entering the New South Wales Parliament, Steve was the unsuccessful candidate for his father's old federal seat of Eden-Monaro in the 1998 and 2001 elections but was unsuccessful on both those occasions.

Notes

1933 births
2015 deaths
Australian Labor Party members of the Parliament of Australia
Members of the Australian House of Representatives
Members of the Australian House of Representatives for Eden-Monaro
Members of the Order of Australia
University of New South Wales alumni
Alumni of the University of Leeds
People from Wodonga
20th-century Australian politicians
Australian agriculturalists